Rebecca Lucy Taylor (born 15 October 1986), also known by her stage name as Self Esteem, is a British musician. First known as one half of the band Slow Club, she launched a solo career as Self Esteem with the single "Your Wife" in 2017, followed by the albums Compliments Please in 2019 and Prioritise Pleasure in 2021. A multi-instrumentalist, vocalist, songwriter and theatre composer, she is winner of the 2021 BBC Music Introducing award and Prioritise Pleasure was nominated for the 2022 Mercury Prize.

Early life
Taylor was born and grew up in Rotherham, England, U.K. Her father was a steelworker, and her mother was a secretary.

Career

2006–2017: music career before Self Esteem 
Taylor was previously a member of folk duo Slow Club, which formed in Sheffield in 2006. The band consisted of multi-instrumentalists Charles Watson and Taylor, with Watson on the piano, Taylor on the drums, and both performing guitars and vocals. The band paused working in 2017, following an extensive tour to support their last album, owing to differing musical interests and Taylor feeling unfulfilled. Slow Club's final tour in the winter of 2016, and Taylor's dissatisfaction and unhappiness with the band, was captured in the documentary Our Most Brilliant Friends, directed by Piers Dennis and released in 2018.

2015–2020: The appearance of Self Esteem and Compliments Please 
Taylor started posting art and short notes on Instagram under the name Self Esteem in 2015. Prior to releasing music under the name, she used Self Esteem for a range of artistic projects including an exhibition of paintings and prints, and short films. Speaking about her stage name, Taylor has said she decided on the name around six years before she started using it, and that "I wanted to call it Sex Appeal or Self Esteem...cos band names are bad, there's no good ones. But I probably should have just called it Rebecca Lucy Taylor!".  A big fan of Queen, she based her logo on Freddie Mercury's signature.

Taylor was inspired with the confidence to pursue a solo career after watching Ru Paul's Drag Race - "that whole ethos of not being ashamed to be confident or brilliant". She credits Jamie T with encouraging her to release her music after she shared some of her early solo work with him; his 2016 album Trick ends with a track called "Self Esteem". Taylor released her first music under the Self Esteem moniker, the single "Your Wife", in September 2017 with "OMG" as a b-side. The track was released on Kick + Clap, a label run by Django Django member Dave MacLean. Her first live show as Self Esteem was in October 2017 at Margate Arts Club. Taylor went on to feature on the Django Django track "Surface to Air", which appeared on the band's 2018 album Marble Skies.

Tracks for the Self Esteem debut album, Compliments Please, were recorded in January-September 2018 and Taylor signed a solo deal with Fiction Records in April 2018. During the period of recording she played live at Latitude, Tramlines and a sold out show at Omeara Theatre London, followed by an eight-show UK tour in autumn 2018. The first single "Wrestling" was released in July 2018 followed by "Rollout" in September 2018, "The Best" in January 2019 and "Girl Crush" in February 2019. Compliments Please was released on 1 March 2019 on Fiction Records. It was well received critically, with an average rating of 80/100 according to Metacritic. A deluxe version was released in October 2019 with an additional track "Rooms". In March 2019 Self Esteem completed an 11-date UK tour in support of the album release and played at UK festivals including Glastonbury, British Summer Time and Latitude. In December 2019 she released a standalone single "All I Want For Christmas Is A Work Email", recorded at Abbey Road Studios.

On 1 May 2020, Self Esteem released the Cuddles Please EP, with stripped down versions of tracks from Compliments Please - "Favourite Problem", "The Best" and "In Time" - along with a cover of "Miami Memory" by Alex Cameron. The EP features Neighbourhood Voices, a Sheffield-based female choir. In the early months of the covid pandemic in 2020 she organised an online all-female festival Pxssy Pandemique to raise money for Women's Aid.

2021–present: Prioritise Pleasure 
In April 2021, Taylor released "I Do This All The Time", the first single from her second album as Self Esteem. The single was praised by Tracey Thorn and by Jack Antonoff. In July, she released the title track and announced that the record, Prioritise Pleasure, would coincide with a UK tour in October of the same year. In August, Self Esteem released the third single, "How Can I Help You". Taylor directed the music videos for those singles, filming all three at the Almeida Theatre. In September, the single "Moody" was released. The video for "Moody" was directed by Louise Bhose and features comedian Alistair Green alongside Taylor. In October, Self Esteem released "You Forever", the final single preceding the album.

Prioritise Pleasure was released on 22 October 2021. The UK tour started on 6 November 2021 in Edinburgh.

The Guardian, The Sunday Times and Gigwise ranked Prioritise Pleasure as the best album of 2021. NME ranked the album as the fourth best of 2021. The Guardian named "I Do This All The Time" as the best song of 2021.

Taylor composed the soundtrack for the West End production of Suzie Miller's play Prima Facie starring Jodie Comer, which she digitally released on 14 June 2022.

The 2023 live tour in support of Prioritise Pleasure, the I Tour This All The Time tour, was announced in March 2022 and originally consisted of 11 dates. Due to popularity of ticket sales, another 10 dates were added to the final tour which sold out before it commenced in February 2023. During the UK tour Self Esteem performed two new, unrecorded songs - "Mother" and "Love Second". Three US dates are planned in April 2023 in Los Angeles, San Francisco and New York. Self Esteem is booked for a number of UK festival dates in summer 2023 including Neighbourhood Weekender, Standon Calling, Parklife and Truck, and will support Blur at their Wembley Stadium gigs in July.

Collaborations
Self Esteem has provided guest vocals for "Strangle of Anna", a song by fellow Sheffield act the Moonlandingz which appeared on their second album, Interplanetary Class Classics. Taylor also performed with the band live.

Style and influences 
Self Esteem's music is characterised by its prominent drum rhythms, female choral elements and powerful, precisely articulated lead vocals, often alongside organs, distorted guitars and string arrangements. Her lyrics and vocal delivery are central to the songs: she has been described as "one of the best lyricists of her generation" and as having live vocals "so clear and pure they could wake bears from hibernation". She writes songs on guitar before arranging them with other musicians. Taylor has described herself and her producer Johan Hugo Karlberg as being "obsessed" with Kanye West, and she has cited a range of other influences including Madonna, Destiny's Child, Rihanna, Little Mix and Queen. Lyrically she explores themes around relationships, self-criticism, sex, mental health, mysogyny, objectification, female empowerment and feminism. Her lyrics often contain reference to internet culture including texting, sexting and social media; in images and videos she is oftened pictured holding or using a mobile phone, and she frequently releases lines of lyrics or poetry on Instagram in the Apple Notes app.

Since they first started touring in 2018, the Self Esteem live band has featured Taylor on lead vocals, 2–3 dancing backing vocalists, a drummer and keyboard/bass player. The shows are known for their energetic performances, with Taylor and her dancers performing choreographed routines throughout. Taylor has said that the Prioritise Pleasure tours were inspired by Madonna's 1990 Blond Ambition Tour, and other writers have drawn comparisons with Pussycat Dolls choreography. Since the release of Prioritise Pleasure, audience members have taken to barking at Self Esteem shows in homage to a voice note at the end of "I'm Fine" in which a woman describes herself and friends barking like dogs when approached by a group of men, as a form of self-protection. 

Self Esteem members coordinate their clothing at live shows often wearing identical slogan t-shirts (see below) and on occasions in Sheffield Wednesday shirts. Taylor has worn notable outfits at Glastonbury performances - in 2019, a dress made from Boots Advantage (loyalty) cards, and in 2022 a corset with a bra shaped like the domes of Sheffield's Meadowhall shopping centre.  

Ten of Self Esteem's singles have been accompanied by music videos. Many of these have been directed by Piers Dennis who worked on the Slow Club documentary Our Most Brilliant Friends. The videos for "How Can I Help You", "Prioritise Pleasure" and "I Do This All The Time" were filmed at Almeida Theatre and directed by Taylor. 

Self Esteem makes use of recurrent slogans that appear on clothing worn by the band live and in videos, and shown on the live backdrop which is usually black with white capital letters. Some of these slogans derive from Self Esteem lyrics and others make related political and artistic statements. These include:

 "Prioritise Pleasure" - first seen on t-shirts worn by the band during the Compliments Please live shows; subsequently the title of the second album; often used as a live backdrop. She has emphasised that the message of "Prioritise Pleasure" as about valuing self worth and self love in the face of social expectations, pressures and fears faced by women, and "that not being indulgent and that not being selfish" 
 "Believe Women" - worn on t-shirts by dancers Marged Siôn and Genesis Lynea in the video for "Rollout", a statement in support of women reporting their experience of sexual harassment, abuse and violence
 "Remember You Don't Owe Them Anything" - printed on the gatefold of Compliments Please; Taylor wears a t-shirt with this slogan in the video for "In Time"; features in the lyrics for "Girl Crush"; and printed in the credits for Prioritise Pleasure.
 "Keep Lyrics Uncomfortable" - features on the bass drum skin on Self Esteem live gigs since 2021 
 "But there is nothing that terrifies a man more than a woman that appears completely deranged" - words from a voice note that appears at the end of "I'm Fine"
 "97%" - featured on a tie worn by Taylor on live TV shows including Graham Norton and The Late Late Show with James Corden, and on a pin badge worn on her suit during the 2023 tour. The statistic refers to a YouGov survey in 2021 which found that 97% of UK women aged 18–24 years old had experienced sexual harassment

Band personnel 
Taylor has emphasised the importance of her collaborators on Self Esteem, saying "I like to think of [Self Esteem] as a sort of collective of people...I've got this real, like, family which is something I've always dreamed of".

Current live band 

 Sophie Galpin (backing vocals, keys, bass)
 Marged Siôn (backing vocals)
 Levi Heaton (backing vocals)
 Seraphina Simone (backing vocals)
 Mike Park (drums)

Previous live band members 

 Kelli Blanchett (backing vocals)

Awards 
{| class="wikitable sortable plainrowheaders" 
|-
! scope="col" | Award
! scope="col" | Year
! scope="col" | Nominee(s)
! scope="col" | Category
! scope="col" | Result
! scope="col" class="unsortable"| 
|-
!scope="row"|Q Awards
| 2019
| rowspan=5|Herself
| Best Breakthrough Act
| 
|
|-
!scope="row"|Attitude Awards
| 2021
| Music Award
| 
| 
|-
! scope="row"|BBC Music Introducing
| 2021
| Artist of the Year
| 
| 
|-
!scope="row"| Brit Awards
| 2022
| British Breakthrough Act
| 
|
|-
!scope="row" rowspan=3|NME Awards
| rowspan=3|2022
| Best Live Act
| 
| rowspan=3|
|-
| rowspan=3|Prioritise Pleasure
| Best Album In The World
| 
|-
| Best Album By A UK Artist
| 
|-
!scope="row"|Mercury Prize
| 2022
| Album of the Year
| 
|

Television appearances 
Self Esteem has appeared on major TV entertainment shows in the UK and the US including Later...with Jools Holland, the Graham Norton Show, Jools' Annual Hootenanny and The Late Late Show with James Corden. 

A self-confessed fan of the UK TV show Taskmaster, Taylor appeared in the 2023 New Year's episode in which she came joint second to winner Sir Mo Farah. Performing at Rockaway Beach festival a week after the episode aired, she changed her signature live backdrop to read "Full Season of Taskmaster When?". A public response has yet to be forthcoming from Alex Horne.

Acting 
Taylor appeared in series two of Everyone Hates Suzie starring Billie Piper in 2022, and has been announced to be appearing in a new comedy Smothered to be aired in 2023.

Personal life 
Taylor has been openly bisexual since 2013. She has spoken about breaking into the industry in her 30s, stating she used to lie and say she was 25. She said it took her "a while to be proud" of breaking into the industry later in life. She has been a supporter of Sheffield Wednesday Football Club since a child, a club that her great-grandfather played for.

Discography

Studio albums
 Compliments Please (2019)
 Prioritise Pleasure (2021)
 Prima Facie (Original Theatre Soundtrack) (2022)

Extended plays
 Cuddles Please (2020)

Singles
 "Your Wife" (2017)
 "Wrestling" (2018)
 "Rollout" (2018)
 "The Rat / Never Leave You (Uh Oooh, Uh Oooh)" [BBC Live Session] (2018)
 "The Best" (2019)
 "Girl Crush" (2019)
 "All I Want For Christmas Is A Work Email" (2019)
 "I Do This All The Time" (2021)
 "Prioritise Pleasure" (2021)
 "How Can I Help You" (2021)
 "Moody" (2021)
 "You Forever" (2021)
 "Fucking Wizardry" (2022)
 "The 345" (2022)

Bibliography 
 Self Esteem (2021)
 The Devolution Of Woman (2023)

References

External links

  – official site
 
 Self Esteem music videos on YouTube

Experimental pop musicians
Living people
Bisexual musicians
Bisexual women
British women drummers
British women pop singers
British women guitarists
English LGBT musicians
1986 births